Glyphipterix monodonta is a species of sedge moth in the genus Glyphipterix. It was described by Alexey Diakonoff in 1948. It is found on Buru.

References

Moths described in 1948
Glyphipterigidae
Moths of Indonesia